Othmar Schneider (27 August 1928 – 25 December 2012) was an Austrian  Alpine skier and Olympic champion. 

Schneider was born in Lech am Arlberg.  At the 1952 Winter Olympics in Oslo, he was the gold medalist in the slalom and the silver medalist in the downhill.

References

Austrian male alpine skiers
1928 births
2012 deaths
Alpine skiers at the 1952 Winter Olympics
Alpine skiers at the 1956 Winter Olympics
Olympic gold medalists for Austria
Olympic medalists in alpine skiing
Medalists at the 1952 Winter Olympics
Olympic alpine skiers of Austria

Olympic silver medalists for Austria